Chilton may refer to:

People 
Surname
 Chilton (surname)

Given name
 Chilton Allan (1786-1858), American lawyer and politician
 Chilton C. Baker (1874-1967), American politician
 Charles Chilton Moore
 Chilton Price
 Joseph Chilton Pearce
 Chilton A. White (1826-1900), American lawyer and politician

Place names 
England
 Chilton, Buckinghamshire
 Chilton, County Durham
 Great Chilton
 Chilton Lane
 Chilton Moor
 Chilton, Kent, a location
 Chilton, Oxfordshire
 Chilton, Suffolk
 Chilton Candover, Hampshire
 Chilton Cantelo, Somerset
 Chilton Foliat, Wiltshire
 Chilton Polden, Somerset
 Chilton Street, Suffolk
 Chilton Trinity, Somerset

United States
 Chilton, Missouri
 Chilton, Texas
 Chilton, Wisconsin, a city partly within the town of Chilton
 Chilton (town), Wisconsin
 Chilton County, Alabama

Other 
 Chilton Times-Journal, newspaper in Chilton, Wisconsin
 USS Chilton (APA-38)
 Frederick Chilton, fictional character in Thomas Harris's Red Dragon and The Silence of the Lambs
 Chilton Academy is a fictional prep school in the TV drama series Gilmore Girls.
 Chilton Company, a publisher commonly known for their automotive maintenance manuals
 2221 Chilton, an asteroid
 Chilton Aircraft, a British aircraft manufacturer

See also
Chiltern (disambiguation)
Shilton (disambiguation)